Statistics of Lao League for the 2004 season.

Overview
It was contested by 11 teams, and MCTPC won the championship.

League standings

Results

Relegation playoff
Prime Minister's Office FC and No-8 Road Construction FC were automatically promoted from Lao League 2. A play off was held between the third place team and the third bottom team in the top division.

References

Lao Premier League seasons
1
Laos
Laos